Zakia Parvin Khanam is a Bangladeshi politician who is elected as Member of 11th Jatiya Sangsad of Reserved Seats for Women. She is a politician of Bangladesh Awami League.

References

Living people
Awami League politicians
People from Netrokona District
11th Jatiya Sangsad members
Year of birth missing (living people)
Women members of the Jatiya Sangsad
21st-century Bangladeshi women politicians